Haplogroup Q-L54 is a subclade of Y-DNA haplogroup Q-L53. Q1a3a-L54 is defined by the presence of the L54 Single Nucleotide Polymorphism (SNP).

Distribution 
Q-L54 has descendants across Western and Central Europe, the North and East of Asia, and the Americas. It includes two of the major pre-Columbian paternal lineages in the Americas: Q-M3 and Q-M971. The boy Anzick-1, who lived 12,600 years ago and was found in the state of Montana, has a Y-chromosome that refers to haplogroup Q-M971 (Q-L54*(xM3)). Q-L54 descendant lines also include two Eurasian paternal lineages, the Central Asian Q-L330 lineage and the Scandinavian Q-L804. Q-L330 is also found in some men with Romaniote Jewish paternal lines from Greece. Q-L804 is Scandinavian and the TMRCA is just over 3000 years.
Haplogroup Q‐L54 is dominant in two North Siberian populations, the Kets and Selkups, with frequencies of 97.7% and 66.7%, respectively.

Associated SNP's 
Q-L54 is currently defined by the L54 SNP alone.

Subgroups 
Current status of the polygenetic tree for Q-L54 is published by Pinotti et al. in the article Y Chromosome Sequences Reveal a Short Beringian Standstill, Rapid Expansion, and early Population structure of Native American Founders. Calibrated phylogeny of Y haplogroup Q-L54.  
 L54 
 Q-L330 
 Q-MPB001 (18.9 kya)
 Q-CTS1780 
 Q-M930 
 Q-L804
 Q-M3 (15.0 kya) 
 Q-Y4308
 Q-M848 (14.9 kya)

The 2013 version of the polygenetic tree for haplogroup Q-L54 made by Thomas Krahn at the Genomic Research Center: Proposed Tree.

 L54
 M3, L341.2
 M19
 M194
 M199, P106, P292
 PAGES104, PAGES126
 PAGES131
 L663
 SA01
 L766, L767
 L883, L884, L885, L886, L887
 L888, L889, L890, L891
 L804, L805
 L807
 Z780
 L191
 L400, L401
 L456
 L568, L569, L570, L571
 L567
 L619.1
 L330, L334
 L329, L332, L333

See also
Human Y-chromosome DNA haplogroup

Y-DNA Q-M242 Subclades

Y-DNA Backbone Tree

References

External links 
The Y-DNA Haplogroup Q Project

Q-L54